Șincai is a commune in Mureș County, Transylvania, Romania composed of four villages: Lechincioara (Kislekence), Pusta (Feketepuszta), Șincai and Șincai-Fânațe (Édeságtelek).

Demographics

The commune has an ethnically mixed population, with a Romanian majority. According to the 2002 Census it has a population of 1,634 of which 56.98% or 931 are Romanian and 40.58% or 663 Hungarian.

The birthplace of the great Romanian historian, linguist and poet Gheorghe Șincai.

See also 
 List of Hungarian exonyms (Mureș County)

References

Communes in Mureș County
Localities in Transylvania